The Export Price Index (EPI) tracks changes in the price which firms and countries receive for products they export.

Increases in the EPI are typically due to strong foreign demand or higher internal costs within the exporter’s country.

Generally, only increases caused by strong foreign demand are beneficial. However, the overall effect of such increases is debatable.

See also
Economic reports

References 
Export Price Index - OECD Glossary of Statistical Terms

Export